Edward Herbert (1767 - 1814) was Archdeacon of Aghadoe from 1798 until his death.

Herbert was educated at Trinity College, Dublin He held incumbencies at Killarney, Killorglin, Knockane, Lyons and Kill, County Kildare. He was Chancellor of Christ Church Cathedral, Dublin from 1809 until his death.

References

Alumni of Trinity College Dublin
Archdeacons of Aghadoe
1814 deaths
1767 births